Ronald Earl Longstaff (born 1941) is an inactive Senior United States district judge of the United States District Court for the Southern District of Iowa.

Education and career

Born in Pittsburg, Kansas, Longstaff received a Bachelor of Arts degree in accounting from Pittsburg State University in 1962 and a Juris Doctor, with honors, from the University of Iowa College of Law in 1965. In law school, he was a comments editor of the Iowa Law Review and published three pieces in the journal. Longstaff was a law clerk for Judge Roy L. Stephenson of the United States District Court for the Southern District of Iowa from 1965 to 1967, during which time he worked on Tinker v. Des Moines Independent Community School District. He was in private practice in Des Moines, Iowa from 1967 to 1968. Longstaff then served as the Clerk of Court for the Southern District of Iowa from 1968 to 1976, and also as the commissioner and then the first full-time United States Magistrate Judge for the district from 1968 to 1991.

Federal judicial service

On July 24, 1991, Longstaff was nominated by President George H. W. Bush to a new seat on the United States District Court for the Southern District of Iowa created by 104 Stat. 5089. He was confirmed by the United States Senate on October 31, 1991, and received his commission on November 5, 1991. He served as Chief Judge from 2001 to 2006, assuming senior status on November 5, 2006. Longstaff has thus far been the only judge on the Southern District of Iowa to preside over a multidistrict litigation, related to Teflon products. In September 2016, Longstaff ceased taking cases. His first law clerk, James E. Gritzner, also became a federal judge in the same district.

References

Sources
 

1941 births
Living people
Judges of the United States District Court for the Southern District of Iowa
United States district court judges appointed by George H. W. Bush
20th-century American judges
University of Iowa College of Law alumni
People from Pittsburg, Kansas
United States magistrate judges
21st-century American judges